The Spence Shale is the middle member of the Langston Formation in southeastern Idaho and northeastern Utah. It is exposed in the Bear River Range, the Wasatch Range and the Wellsville Mountains. It is known for its abundant Cambrian trilobites and the preservation of Burgess Shale-type fossils.

The type locality is Spence Gulch in southeastern Idaho, near the town of Liberty. It was first described by Charles Doolittle Walcott in 1908.

Stratigraphy 

The Spence Shale spans the Albertella and Glossopleura biozones.

Fauna
 
Generic list of the fauna of the Spence Shale:

Arthropoda

Soft-bodied
Anomalocaris
Canadaspis
Caryosyntrips
Dioxycaris
Hurdia
Isoxys
Leanchoilia
Meristosoma
Mollisonia
Sidneyia
Tuzoia
Utahcaris
Waptia
Yohoia

Agnostida
Pentagnostus
Ptychagnostus

Trilobita
Alokistocare
Alokistocarella
Amecephalus
Athabaskia
Bathyuriscus
Bythicheilus
Chancia
Ehmaniella
Glossopleura
Kochina
Kootenia
Ogygopsis
Olenoides
Oryctocara
Oryctocephalites
Oryctocephalus
Pagetia
Piochaspis
Polypleuraspis
Ptychoparella
Solenopleura
Syspacephalus
Thoracocare
Utia
Zacanthoides

Brachiopoda
Acrothele
Dictyonina
Diraphora
Lingulella
Micromitra?
Wimanella

Mollusca
Latouchella
Scenella
Wiwaxia

Lophotrochozoa
Haplophrentis
Hyolithellus
Hyolithes

Echinodermata
Ctenocystis
Gogia
Lyracystis
Ponticulocarpus
Totiglobus

Hemichordata
Margaretia
Sphenoecium

Priapulida
Ottoia
Selkirkia
Wronascolex?

Lobopodia
Acinocricus
Hallucigenia

Porifera
Brooksella?
Protospongia
Vauxia

Problematica
Banffia
Eldonia
Siphusauctum

Algae
Marpolia

Cyanobacteria
Morania

Trace Fossils
Archaeonassa
Arenicolites 
Aulichnites
Bergaueria
Chloephycus
Conichnus
Coprolite
Cruziana
Dimorphichnus 
Diplichnites
Gordia
Gyrophyllites
Halopoa
Lockeia
Monomorphichnus
Nereites
Phycodes
Phycosiphon
Planolites
Protovirgularia
Rusophycus
Sagittichnus
Scolicia
Taenidium
Teichichnus
Tomaculum
Treptichnus
Trichophycus

See also

 List of fossiliferous stratigraphic units in Idaho
 List of fossiliferous stratigraphic units in Utah
 Paleontology in Idaho
 Paleontology in Utah

References

 

Shale formations of the United States
Cambrian Idaho
Cambrian geology of Utah
Cambrian System of North America
Cambrian southern paleotropical deposits